Lele is a Mande language of Guinea.

References

Mande languages
Languages of Guinea